Wu Ke-Xi (born 6 February 1983) is a Taiwanese actress. She has had starring roles in most of Midi Z's films. In 2016, Wu was nominated for the Golden Horse Award for Best Leading Actress for her role in The Road to Mandalay.

Life and career 
Wu received her bachelor's degree in Turkish language and culture at National Chengchi University. Besides English and Turkish, she also learned Burmese, Thai and Southwestern Mandarin for her performances as Sino-Burmese characters in several Midi Z's films.

Filmography

Feature film

Short film

Telefilm

Television series

Theater

Awards and nominations

References

External links

 

1983 births
Living people
21st-century Taiwanese actresses
Taiwanese film actresses
Taiwanese stage actresses
Taiwanese television actresses
National Chengchi University alumni
Affiliated Senior High School of National Taiwan Normal University alumni